Guioa truncata is a species of plant in the family Sapindaceae. It is endemic to Mindanao, in the Philippines.

References

truncata
Endemic flora of the Philippines
Flora of Mindanao
Trees of the Philippines
Endangered flora of Asia
Taxonomy articles created by Polbot